85–89 Micklegate is a Grade II* listed medieval building in the city centre of York, England.

The building was constructed in about 1500, in the grounds of Micklegate Priory and facing onto Micklegate, one of the main streets in York.  The building does not appear on John Speed's generally accurate map of the city in 1610, which has led to an argument that it was constructed after this date; but stylistic features, such as the double-jettying on the front and the crown post roof, point to an earlier date, and Speed's omission may have been in order to show the buildings associated with the priory more clearly.

It is likely that the building was constructed to be rented out and provide more income for the priory.  Its division into three properties is original, and originally each property had a single room on each of the three floors.  Stairs appear to have originally been in annexes at the back of the buildings, but about 1600 a wing was added at the back of number 89, while in the 18th century one was added to number 87.  Around 1660, the building was rendered to improve its weatherproofing.  From at least the early 18th century, the properties were occupied by butchers.  The current ground-floor shop windows are Victorian.

The building was listed in 1954, but by 1967 it was in poor condition.  It was restored by the Ings Property Company, the process including the removal of the external rendering, and it is now owned by the York Conservation Trust.  The ground floor is used by shops, with apartments above.

References

Micklegate 85-89
Grade II* listed houses
Houses completed in 1500
Houses in North Yorkshire
Micklegate
Timber framed buildings in Yorkshire